The Luxembourg Station in Brussels is a 1903 painting by Henri Ottmann. It's displayed at the Musée d'Orsay in Paris.

In the Salon of Free Aesthetics, Brussels, 1903, Henri Ottmann for the first time exhibited three views of the city's Luxembourg Station, picturing one weather condition for each view: wind, frost and fog. It is probable that the painting was one of these three.

The point of view is from a bridge which shadows the crossing train tracks. The signal stands just behind the frame, the painting shows its top. This motif is similar to Claude Monet's Track signals outside Saint-Lazare station, 1877 (Hanover, Lower Saxony State Museum). Ottmann was inspired by French Impressionists, particularly Pierre-Auguste Renoir.

Picturing modern subjects in an ornamental way was one of the points of interest of Ottmann.

References

External links
The Luxembourg Station in Brussels at musee-orsay.fr

1903 paintings
Paintings by Henry Ottmann
Paintings in the collection of the Musée d'Orsay